Terence Groothusen (born 16 September 1996) is a footballer who plays as a forward for AO Poros. Born in the mainland Netherlands, he plays for the Aruba national team. Besides the Netherlands, he has played in Malta and Germany.

Club career
Groothusen made his Eerste Divisie debut for FC Dordrecht on 18 August 2017 in a game against Fortuna Sittard.

On 12 February 2020, Groothusen joined Kozakken Boys.

On 24 June 2020, it was announced that Groothusen had signed for SV Straelen.

In January of 2021, Groothusen joined Alemannia Aachen.

International career
Groothusen made his Aruba national football team debut on 6 September 2019 in a CONCACAF Nations League game against Guyana, as a starter.

International goals
Scores and results list Aruba's goal tally first, score column indicates score after each Groothusen goal.

References

External links
 
 

1996 births
Living people
Footballers from Amsterdam
Aruban footballers
Aruba international footballers
Dutch footballers
Dutch people of Aruban descent
Dutch expatriate footballers
HFC EDO players
FC Dordrecht players
Hibernians F.C. players
Kozakken Boys players
SV 19 Straelen players
Alemannia Aachen players
Rot Weiss Ahlen players
Derde Divisie players
Eerste Divisie players
Maltese Premier League players
Regionalliga players
Association football forwards
Dutch expatriate sportspeople in Malta
Expatriate footballers in Malta
Dutch expatriate sportspeople in Germany
Expatriate footballers in Germany